The Zytek ZA1348, also known as the Zytek ZA348, is a 3.4-liter, naturally-aspirated, V8 racing engine, designed, developed and produced by British manufacturer Zytek, between 2003 and 2004. It was specifically constructed and built as the spec-engine for the new A1GP open-wheel formula racing series, and debuted in 2005. It powered the Lola B05/52 A1 Grand Prix car. The engine itself is very light, weighing only , constructed out of cast aluminum alloy.

Applications
Lola B05/52
Ginetta G50Z

References

Engines by model
Gasoline engines by model
Zytek engines
V8 engines